Jacket Full of Danger is Adam Green's fourth solo album, released in 2006. It revisits the string-laden melodrama of his second album Friends of Mine, mostly abandoning the uptempo country folk sound of his previous release, Gemstones.

Lyrically, the album explores the same mournful terrain as Gemstones with Green's familiar obsession with drugs, surrealism and failed relationships.

The album's cover art is an illustrated photograph by American artist Galen Pehrson and was featured in Artforum 10.6Vol-9UK The image depicts Green with a suite of  illustrated characters, each character refers or symbolizes a social theorist, philosopher, or semiotician: Roland Barthes, Jacques Derrida, Louis Althusser, and most notable Sigmund Freud and Jacques Lacan engaged in a "dance".

In the UK, the album was preceded by the single "Nat King Cole" which also features artwork by Pehrson.

Track listing 
All songs written by Adam Green

"Pay the Toll" – 2:15
"Hollywood Bowl" – 1:33
"Vultures" – 2:02
"Novotel" – 1:39
"Party Line" – 2:17
"Hey Dude" – 1:39
"Nat King Cole" – 2:32
"C Birds" – 2:04
"Animal Dreams" – 1:48
"Cast a Shadow" – 1:57
"Drugs" – 2:03
"Jolly Good" – 2:01
"Watching Old Movies" – 2:00
"White Women" – 2:59
"Hairy Women" – 1:33

"Cast a Shadow" is an interpretation of the Beat Happening song of the same name.

Personnel 
Adam Green - voice, guitar, tuba on 9
Steven Mertens - bass except on 12, 15
Bill Moulten - bass on 12, 15
Joan Wasser - cello
Parker Kindred - drums
Chris Isom - guitar
Emily Lazar - mastering
Nathan Brown - organ (Wurlitzer), piano
Dan Myers - recording, mixing
David Gold - viola on 2
Antoine Silverman, Lorenza Ponce - violin
Jane Scarpantoni - violin, strings arrangement

2006 albums
Adam Green (musician) albums
Rough Trade Records albums